The Rock Island Depot is a historic railroad depot in downtown Faribault, Minnesota, United States, constructed by the Burlington, Cedar Rapids and Northern Railway in January 1902. The line was turned over to the Chicago, Rock Island, and Pacific Railroad in June of the same year.

The depot was constructed for use as a passenger depot and originally contained four rooms. The central pavilion area, housing office and entry, was flanked by men and women's waiting rooms to the south and north; a baggage room occupied the room to the north of the ladies waiting room. After the 1930s, the building was converted to use as a combination passenger/freight depot.

For a time, the depot was served by the famous Twin Star Rocket.

References

Faribault
Former railway stations in Minnesota
Railway buildings and structures on the National Register of Historic Places in Minnesota
Railway stations in the United States opened in 1902
Railway stations on the National Register of Historic Places in Minnesota